Anisopodus batesi is a species of beetle in the family Cerambycidae that was described by Gilmour in 1965.

References

Anisopodus
Beetles described in 1965